Hext is an unincorporated community in Menard County, Texas, United States. According to the Handbook of Texas, the community had an estimated population of 73 in 2000.

Geography
Hext is situated at the intersection of State Highway 29 and FM 1221, approximately 16 miles east of Menard and 131 miles northwest of Austin in eastern Menard County.

History
The community was first known as Maringo (or Marengo) when it was settled in the 1870s. When local residents attempted to establish a post office in 1895, they found that Maringo was already taken and decided on the name Hext in honor of Joseph Robert "Bob" Hext (1859–1941).  Mr. Hext was one of the first settlers in the area. The post office was established in 1897, which made the name permanent.

Hext reached its peak around 1914, when it had 125 residents, two general stores, a hotel, cotton gin, and a Church of Christ that had been organized in 1904. A Baptist church was established in 1916. The community's population had declined to 40 by the mid-1920s, but rebounded to around 60 in the late 1940s. By 1988, Hext reported 64 residents. That figure had grown slightly, to 73, by 2000.

Although Hext is unincorporated, it continues to have a post office in operation with the zip code of 76848. Several abandoned buildings remain in Hext, such as an old schoolhouse and church.

Climate

Hext experiences a humid subtropical climate, with hot summers and a generally mild winter. Temperatures range from 95 °F (35 C) in the summer to 31 °F (-.06 C) during winter.

Education
Public education in the community of Hext is provided by the Menard Independent School District.

References

External links

Unincorporated communities in Menard County, Texas
Unincorporated communities in Texas
Ghost towns in Central Texas